The French ironclad Guyenne was one of 10  armored frigates built for the French Navy during the 1860s. Commissioned in 1867, she was initially assigned to the Northern Squadron. The ironclad played a minor role in the Franco-Prussian War of 1870–1871, blockading the Baltic and North Sea coasts of Prussia. Guyenne was decommissioned after the war, but was reactivated in 1877. She was transferred to the Mediterranean Squadron later that year and then to the Eastern Mediterranean the following year. The ship was reduced to reserve in 1879, stricken from the naval register three years later and was scrapped in 1887.

Design and description

The Provence class was designed as an enlarged version of the s with thicker armor, more powerful guns, and better seakeeping qualities. They displaced . Their crew numbered 579–594 officers and enlisted men.

Guyenne had a single two-cylinder horizontal-return connecting-rod steam engine that drove the propeller shaft, using steam provided by eight boilers.

Armament and protection
The main battery of the Provence-class ships was intended to be thirty  Modèle 1858–60 rifled muzzle-loading (RML) guns, but this was changed to a mixed armament of four  Modèle 1864 MLRs and six  Modèle 1864 smoothbore muzzle-loading guns on the gundeck. Positioned on the quarterdeck and the forecastle were another 194 mm RML and six 164.7 mm Modèle 1858 RMLs, at least some of which served as chase guns.

The conning tower's sides consisted of  armor plates.

Construction and service

Guyenne, named after the historic province, was ordered on 16 November 1860 from the Arsenal de Rochefort, laid down on 11 February 1861 and launched on 6 September 1865. She was commissioned for trials on 15 April 1867, completed that same month, but was not definitively commissioned until 6 November. Guyenne was assigned to the Ironclad Division of the Northern Squadron, based in Cherbourg. She was in reserve when the Franco-Prussian War began on 19 July 1870. The ship was assigned to Vice Admiral Édouard Bouët-Willaumez's squadron that was tasked to blockade German ports in the Heligoland Bight. It departed Cherbourg on 24 July and, failing to find any German ships, proceeded to Danish waters to wait for further instructions. Bouët-Williaumez was ordered on 2 August to split his forces with half, including Guyenne, proceeding into the Baltic Sea to blockade the Prussian ports there under his command and the others to return to the Bight. The strong Prussian coastal defenses prevented any attack by the French ships, but their presence severely inhibited German shipping. Bouët-Willaumez was ordered to return to Cherbourg on 16 September where Guyenne joined the ships blockading the Bight. By then the Prussians were besieging Paris and many of the trained gunners aboard the squadron were transferred to defend the city. The squadron resumed the blockade with reduced crews until December when smaller ships took it over. After her sister  lost her rudder in a storm on 12 October, she had to be towed back to Cherbourg by Guyenne.

The ship was paid off and disarmed in May 1871 and remained in reserve until 1877 when she was reactivated for service with the Channel Division. Later that year Guyenne was transferred to the Squadron of Evolutions of the Mediterranean Squadron. She was detached to the Eastern Mediterranean in 1878, but was reduced to reserve at Toulon on 1 February 1879. The ship was stricken on 19 October 1882, listed for sale the following year, and scrapped in 1887.

Citations

Bibliography

Further reading

1865 ships
Provence-class ironclads
Ships built in France